Uncial 0115 (in the Gregory-Aland numbering), ε 57 (Soden); is a Greek uncial manuscript of the New Testament, dated paleographically to the 9th or 10th-century. Formerly it was labelled by Wa.

Description 
The codex contains 23 verses of the Gospel of Luke (9:35-47; 10:12-22), on two parchment leaves (25 cm by 18 cm). The text is written in two columns per page, 23 lines per page, in uncial letters.

It contains music notes in red; it has accents and breathings, but not always. All the stops are expressed by a single point, whose position makes no difference in its significance. The original codex contained the text of the four Gospels on 190 leaves.

There is also a division according to the Ammonian Sections, with references to the Eusebian Canons. It contains lectionary markings at the margin (for liturgical use).

The uncial letters are firmly written, delta and theta being of the ordinary oblong shape of that period.

Survived two leaves of the codex were included to the Lectionary 88.

Text 

The Greek text of this codex is a mixture of text-types. Aland placed it in Category III.

In Luke 10:12-22 the text of the manuscript 15 times differs from the Textus Receptus from the Elzevier edition.

It was not examined according to the Claremont Profile Method.

History 

Currently it is dated by the INTF to the 9th or 10th-century.

The codex was adapted to the Church use, but it is not a Lectionary. This fragment was brought to light by Scholz. It was at the end of another book. The text was published by Constantin von Tischendorf in Monumenta sacra inedita (1846).

The codex is currently located in the Bibliothèque nationale de France (Gr. 314, ff. 179, 180), in Paris.

See also 

 List of New Testament uncials
 Biblical manuscript
 Textual criticism

References

Further reading 

 Constantin von Tischendorf, Monumenta sacra inedita (Leipzig: 1846), pp. 51 ff.

External links 
 Uncial 0115 at the Wieland Willker, "Textual Commentary"

Greek New Testament uncials
9th-century biblical manuscripts
Bibliothèque nationale de France collections